Gada Ale is a stratovolcano located in the Afar Region, Ethiopia. It is the most prominent volcano at the northern end of the Erta Ale Range.

See also
List of volcanoes in Ethiopia
List of stratovolcanoes

References 
 

Mountains of Ethiopia
Stratovolcanoes of Ethiopia
Afar Region